Alex Weil (July 31, 1951 – April 17, 2019) was the founder and executive creative director of the New York City based digital design and production studio Charlex (now CHRLX), which he founded alongside Charlie Levi (the company's name is a portmentau of their first names). He was awarded the "Video of the Year" MTV Video Music Award in 1984 for directing "You Might Think" by The Cars, and also wrote and directed the SIGGRAPH award-winning short digital animation One Rat Short.

References

External links

American music video directors
2019 deaths
Emmy Award winners
1951 births
Businesspeople from New York City
20th-century American businesspeople